The 2019 Trofeo Laigueglia was a one-day road cycling race that took place on 17 February 2019 in and around Laigueglia. It was the 56th edition of the Trofeo Laigueglia and was rated as a 1.HC event as part of the 2019 UCI Europe Tour. 

The race was won by Simone Velasco.

Teams
Twenty teams of up to seven riders started the race:

UCI WorldTeams

 
 

UCI Professional Continental Teams

 
 
 
 
 
 
 
 

UCI Continental Teams

 
 Beltrami Petroli Firenze–Hoppla
 
 
 
 
 Iseo Rime Carnovali
 Sangemini–Trevigiani–Mg.K Vis
 

National Teams
 Italy

Result

References 

Trofeo Laigueglia
Trofeo Laigueglia
2019